Waldemar Świerzy ( 1931 – 27 November 2013) was a Polish artist.

Life
Born in Katowice, Poland, he graduated from the Kraków Academy of Fine Arts in 1952.  He was subsequently  Professor in the University of Fine Arts in Poznań from 1965 and Professor in the Academy of Fine Arts in Warsaw from 1994.

In 1992 the government of Poland issued a postage stamp to honor one of his Cyrk posters, 'Clown with derby'.  Swierzy is one of the Polish School of Posters' most prolific artists, having created over 2500 posters.  

He employed unusual concepts with a variety of techniques, frequently mirroring Polish social history from 1950s through 1980s, with a myriad of styles: folk art from the 50s, pop art from the 60s, portraits from the 70s, and TV images from the 80s.  In addition, his Jazz Greats series of famous American jazz personalities became so well known that he reissued them in his later years as signed lithographs. The series includes: Louis Armstrong, Ray Charles, Jimi Hendrix, Charles Mingus and Charlie Parker, among others. The lithographs were editioned by S2Art. The first group, which came out in March 2003, were of Ray Charles, Ella Fitzgerald, Thelonious Monk, Benny Goodman, Miles Davis, and Dizzy Gillespie. King Oliver and Lester Young followed a few years later.

Major awards 
1956 - Tadeusz Trepkowski Prize, Warsaw, PL
1959, 1962 - 1st (Toulouse-Lautrec) Prize -1st and 3rd International Film Posters Exhibition, Versailles, FR
1961, 1962, 1963, 1966 August -"Best Poster of the Month": 1968, 1971, 1972, 1975 February -"Best Poster of the Month", 1976, 1980, 1983, 1988 -"Best Poster of the Year", Warsaw's Best Poster Competition, PL
1964 - 1st Prize -Film Poster, "Poster of the Year", Copenhagen, DK
1965 - 1st Prize, 1971-1st Prize, 1975-1st Prize, 1977-2nd Prize, 1985-1st Prize, 1987-2nd Prize, 1989-1st Prize -Polish Poster Biennale, Katowice, PL
1967, 1971 - Award, Posters -Polish Ministry of Culture & Art, Warsaw, PL
1970 - 1st Prize -X Art Biennale di Sao Paulo, BR
1972 - 2nd Prize, 1976 -1st Prize -4th and 6th International Poster Biennale, Warsaw, PL
1975 - 1st Prize, 1980 -2nd Prize, 1985-1st Prize -Key Art Award, Posters -The Hollywood Reporter, Los Angeles
1977 - 1st Prize -II Poster Biennale, Lahti, FI
1985 – 1st Prize in the Annual Film Poster Competition of "The Hollywood Reporter", Los Angeles 
1985 - 1st, 3rd Prize -"Jazzpo", International Jazz Poster Exhibition, Bydgoszcz, PL

Major exhibitions 
1960 – Galerie in der Biberstrasse; Vienna, Austria
1964 – Documenta Kassel; Kassel; Germany
1978 – Poster Museum Wilanow; Warsaw, Poland
1980 – Poliforum Siqueiros; Mexico City, Mexico
1982 – Galerie Oxe; Copenhagen, Denmark
1989 – Taldemuseo; Lahti, Finland
1991 – Creation Gallery GB, Tokyo, Japan
1993 – Festival de l'Affiche, Chaumont, France
2000 – Plakat Kunsf Hof; Essen, Germany
2001 – Museum of Contemporary Art; Tehran, Iran
2002 – Muzeum Miasta Wroclawia; Wroclaw, Poland 

Member - Alliance Graphique International [AGI] since 1965.

References

External links
Waldemar Swierzy's Posters at lesaffiches.com. In French
Waldemar Swierzy's Posters at ContemporaryPosters.com

2013 deaths
Academic staff of the University of Fine Arts in Poznań
Polish poster artists
Jan Matejko Academy of Fine Arts alumni
1931 births
Academic staff of the Academy of Fine Arts in Warsaw